Combat Logistics Battalion 4 (CLB-4) is a logistics unit of the United States Marine Corps (USMC). The battalion falls under the command of Combat Logistics Regiment 3, which is a part of the 3rd Marine Logistics Group. They are based on Camp Schwab, Okinawa, Japan and their mission includes construction, demolition, supply, transportation, maintenance and fabrication.

Subordinate units
 Headquarters and Service Company
 Motor T Company

Mission
Provide direct support (DS) tactical logistics to a 4th Marine Regiment beyond its organic capabilities in the areas of transportation, intermediate level supply, field level maintenance, and general engineering.

History

CLB-4 / CLR-3 was originally 3rd Transportation Support Battalion until changing in 2007. CLB-4 was the first full battalion to deploy from Okinawa, Japan since the Vietnam War. The battalion deployed to Al Anbar Province, Iraq in support of Regimental Combat 6 during Operation Iraqi Freedom in 2007 and 2009. The battalion had one Marine injured and no fatalities during these deployments. CLB-4 has also deployed in support of OEF.

See also

 List of United States Marine Corps battalions
 Organization of the United States Marine Corps

References

External links
CLB-4's official website

CLB4